GDP-Man:Man2GlcNAc2-PP-dolichol alpha-1,6-mannosyltransferase (GDP-Man:Man2GlcNAc2-PP-Dol alpha-1,6-mannosyltransferase, Alg2 mannosyltransferase, ALG2 (gene), GDP-Man:Man1GlcNAc2-PP-dolichol mannosyltransferase) is an enzyme with systematic name GDP-D-mannose:D-Man-alpha-(1->3)-D-Man-beta-(1->4)-D-GlcNAc-beta-(1->4)-D-GlcNAc-diphosphodolichol alpha-6-mannosyltransferase. This enzyme catalyses the following chemical reaction

 GDP-D-mannose + D-Man-alpha-(1->3)-D-Man-beta-(1->4)-D-GlcNAc-beta-(1->4)-D-GlcNAc-diphosphodolichol  GDP + D-Man-alpha-(1->3)-[D-Man-alpha-(1->6)]-D-Man-beta-(1->4)-D-GlcNAc-beta-(1->4)-D-GlcNAc-diphosphodolichol

The biosynthesis of asparagine-linked glycoproteins utilizes a dolichyl diphosphate-linked glycosyl donor.

Human proteins containing this domain
ALG2

References

External links 
 

EC 2.4.1